Cari may refer to:

People
 Cari people, also Kari, an indigenous tribe of the Andaman Islands
 Cari (name)
Cari Cari, Austrian band

Places
 Carì, a village in the Swiss canton of Ticino

Organizations
 Cari Internet, Malaysian internet company
Central Avian Research Institute
 China Africa Research Initiative

Species
Actinia cari, species of Sea anemone 
Navicula cari, species of Algae

Other
 7680 Cari, main belt asteroid discovered in 1996
 Cari or Aka-Cari language, spoken by the Cari people
 Cassa di Risparmio (disambiguation), list of Italian savings bank which also known as Cari-demonym

See also

Cali (disambiguation)
Capri (disambiguation)
Car (disambiguation)
Card (disambiguation)
Care (disambiguation)
Carib (disambiguation)
Cari-kalamator
Cari fottutissimi amici, Italian name of 1994 film, Dear Goddamned Friends
CariPac
CariAccess Communications
Carn (disambiguation)
Carp (disambiguation)
Cart (disambiguation)